XHAC-FM is a radio station on 106.9 FM in Aguascalientes, Aguascalientes. It is owned by Radio Universal and carries a news format known as Radio Formula 106.9.

History
XHAC signed on in 1966 as XEAC-AM on 1400 kHz. It was owned by Jesús Ramírez Gamez until 1994. Until August 2015, this station carried the Ke Buena format from Televisa Radio.

At the end of 2019, XHAC joined Radio Formula.

References

Spanish-language radio stations
Radio stations in Aguascalientes
Mass media in Aguascalientes City